The Yakovalı Hasan Paşa Mosque is a late 16th-century mosque in Pécs, southern Hungary. It was constructed when the region was part of the Turkish Ottoman Empire, around the same time as the main mosque of Pécs, the Mosque of Pasha Qasim (which has since been consecrated as a cathedral). It was named after the local government official who commissioned the mosque, Yakovalı Hasan Paşa (Hasan Paşa of Gjakova). It is thus one of the oldest mosques existing in Hungary today. The mosque is still active as a Muslim place of worship, and also houses a small exhibition centre for Turkish handicraft and historical artifacts documenting Hungary's Ottoman past.

History

The mosque was built some decades after the Ottoman conquest of central Hungary. Its architect and exact date of construction are unknown. It was in use for more than a century before being presumably abandoned from late 1686 when Pécs was captured by Austrian forces, after which it served as a hospital. Between 1702 and 1732, it was converted into a Catholic chapel by the Bishop Wilhelm Franz von Nesselrode. During this time, the minaret was turned into a bell tower, with the ruined spire being replaced with a belfry. Its interior was decorated with Baroque carvings which were then in fashion.

The mosque was first restored in the 1960s, when the minaret was repaired and the Baroque ornamentation removed to restore the mosque to its original condition. A second restoration was conducted in the 2000s, in time for Pécs's designation as the European Capital for Culture in 2010 (along with Istanbul and Essen).

The mosque is open to the public on designated days except Mondays and Friday services from 2.30 to 3.30 pm.

Architecture

Yakovalı Hasan Paşa Mosque has a relatively simple structure, with a square base surmounted by a typical Turkish dome and ogee windows. As with all mosques, it is orientated towards Mecca and thus has a northwest–southeast axis. The minaret is 22.5 m high. A flight of stairs leads to the top of the minaret, but due to stability concerns the entrance is sealed off to visitors. The balcony was once adorned with a stone railing. On religious holidays the minaret used to be lit up with oil lamps (see also mahya lights). There was once a foyer on the northwest side of the mosque, part of a larger complex which included a tekke and madrassa.

A statue of the Ottoman chronicler İbrahim Peçevi (Ibrahim of Pécs), by Turkish sculptor Metin Yurdanur, was unveiled before the mosque in 2016.

Gallery

References

External links
 Budapest.com: The Mosque and Minaret of Yakovali Hassan
 Irány Pécs (Visit Pécs): The Mosque of Pasha Yakovali Hassan
 Ottoman Traces in Hungary (in Turkish)

Further reading

 Dercsényi Dezső, Pogány Frigyes, Szentkirályi Zoltán: - Pécs, Műszaki Könyvkiadó, Budapest 1966
 Rados Jenő: Magyar építészettörténet (p. 161-168) - 1961. Bp. Műszaki K. - ETO 72 (439) 091
 Szerk. Fülep L.: A magyarországi művészet története (p. 371-372) - Bp.1961. Képzőmúv. Alap K. - Kossuth Ny. 61.3465.
 Goldziher Ignác: Az iszlám kultúrája - Gondolat K. Bp. 1981. - 
 Francis Robinson: Az iszlám világ atlasza. Ford. Dezsényi Katalin. Budapest: Helikon; Magyar Könyvklub. 1996. - 
 H. Stierlin: Türkei - Architektur von Seldschuken bis Osmanen - Taschen Weltarchitektur -  
 H. Stierlin: Iszlám művészet és építészet - Bp. Alexandra K. - 
 Idrisz Baba türbéje, utazzitthon.hu

Tourist attractions in Pécs
Buildings and structures in Pécs
Ottoman mosques in Hungary